This is a list of songs that reached number one on the Billboard magazine Streaming Songs chart in 2023.

Chart history

See also 

 2023 in American music
 List of Billboard Hot 100 number ones of 2023

References 

United States Streaming Songs
Streaming 2023